Kothanalloor  is a village located in Vaikom Taluk of Kottayam District of Kerala, India. It is situated on the Kottayam-Ernakulam (Cochin) highway, 17.5 kilometers from Kottayam and 49.1 kilometers from Ernakulam.
The nearest railway station is at Kuruppanthara, which is 3.9 kilometers away.

History
Kothanalloor is mentioned in Unnineeli sandhesham (14th century AD) and annals of Synod of Diamper (AD 1599).

Demography
The latest census is ongoing in 2021.

Religion
Hinduism and Christianity are both practiced in Kothanalloor. The main places of worship are the Devi Temple (Vana Durga Devi), Mar Sapor and Mar Proth Forane Church and St.Mary's Knanaya Catholic Church.

Mar Sabor and Mar Proth Forane Church is one of the most ancient churches in India, established in 826AD.

Education
Emmanuel's High School Kothanalloor began as the 'Mudappa Vernacular (Secondary) School' in 1919. It has over 2500 students and employs more than 80 people.

References

Villages in Kottayam district